Anson is an unincorporated community located in the town of Anson, Chippewa County, Wisconsin, United States.

History
A post office called Anson was established in 1895, and remained in operation until it was discontinued in 1901. The community was named for Anson Burlingame.

Notes

Unincorporated communities in Chippewa County, Wisconsin
Unincorporated communities in Wisconsin